Rejman is a surname. Notable people with the surname include:

Miroslav Rejman (1925–2008), Czech ice hockey player 
Sebastian Rejman (born 1978), Finnish singer, actor, and television host
Travis Rejman, American activist

See also
Rehman (disambiguation)